Lyman R. Critchfield (May 22, 1831 – November 28, 1917) was a Democratic politician from the state of Ohio. He was Ohio Attorney General from 1863–1865.

Lyman R. Critchfield was born May 22, 1831 at Danville, Knox County, Ohio. His family moved to Millersburg, Holmes County, Ohio in 1834. He attended public schools and graduated from Ohio Wesleyan University. He then studied law and was admitted to the bar in 1853, when he began practicing in Millersburg. He was elected Prosecuting Attorney of Holmes County in 1859 and re-elected in 1861. He resigned in 1862 when elected as State Attorney General.

In 1862 Critchfield was nominated by the Democratic Party for Attorney General, and defeated Republican Chauncey N. Olds in the general election. In 1864, he ran again and was defeated by Republican William P. Richardson. In 1868 he lost the election for Ohio's 14th congressional district to Martin Welker.

In 1887, he was nominated for Supreme Court Judge, but lost to Republican William T. Spear. In 1888 he tried again and lost to Joseph Perry Bradbury.

Lyman R. Critchfield married Adelaide Margaret Shaffer on October 2, 1854 and had seven children. He was a Mason, and Methodist Episcopal by faith. In later years he lived in Wooster, Ohio. Adelaide burned to death in 1895, and Lyman died at his desk at Millersburg in 1917.

Notes

References

External links

People from Millersburg, Ohio
People from Wooster, Ohio
Ohio Wesleyan University alumni
Ohio Democrats
Ohio lawyers
Ohio Attorneys General
1831 births
1917 deaths
County district attorneys in Ohio
19th-century American politicians
Methodists from Ohio
People from Danville, Ohio